Signal was a magazine published by the Wehrmacht of Nazi Germany from 1940 through 1945.

Summary 
Signal was an illustrated photo journal and army propaganda tool, meant specifically for audiences in neutral, allied, and occupied countries. A German edition was distributed in Switzerland, Axis countries, and German-occupied Europe, but Signal was never distributed in Germany proper.

The journal was published by Ullstein Verlag and characterized by an outstanding print quality for the time. Each issue contained several (mostly eight) color pages, which was very unusual at the time.

The promoter of the magazine was the chief of the Wehrmacht Propaganda Troops, Colonel Hasso von Wedel. Signal was published fortnightly (plus some special issues) in as many as 25 editions and 30 languages, and at its height had a circulation of 2,500,000 copies. It was available in the United States in English until December 1941. The last number was 6/45, only known in one sample from the Swedish edition.

See also
 Der Adler - Luftwaffe equivalent
 Kriegsmarine - German Navy equivalent
 Die Wehrmacht - Covering all the armed services

Further reading
 Sara Krolewski, "The Enemy as Sociologist", Cabinet 27 April 2021
 Rainer Rutz: "Signal". Eine deutsche Auslandsillustrierte als Propagandainstrument im Zweiten Weltkrieg Klartext, Essen 2007.  (German)
 Klaus-Richard Böhme, Bosse Schön: Signal Nazitysklands Propaganda i Sverige 1941–45, Bokförlaget DN, Stockholm 2005.  (Swedish)

1940 establishments in Germany
1945 disestablishments in Germany
Defunct political magazines published in Germany
Biweekly magazines published in Germany
German-language magazines
Magazines established in 1940
Magazines disestablished in 1945
Magazines published in Berlin
Fascist newspapers and magazines
Propaganda newspapers and magazines